The Aphididae are a very large insect family in the aphid superfamily (Aphidoidea), of the order Hemiptera. These insects suck the sap from plant leaves. Several thousand species are placed in this family, many of which are considered plant/crop pests. They are the family of insects containing most plant virus vectors (around 200 known) with the green peach aphid (Myzus persicae) being one of the most prevalent and indiscriminate carriers.

Evolution

Reproduction
Most aphid species can reproduce both asexually and sexually, with several
parthenogenetic generations between each period of sexual reproduction. This is
known as cyclical parthenogenesis and, in temperate regions, sexual reproduction
occurs in autumn and results in the production of overwintering eggs, which hatch
the following spring and initiate another cycle. Many pest aphids, however, do not
overwinter as an egg but as nymphs or adults and others as both eggs and active
stages (see Williams and Dixon 2007). For their size, the parthenogenetic individuals have very short developmental times and potentially prodigious rates of increase
(de Réaumur 1737; Huxley 1858; Kindlmann and Dixon 1989; Dixon 1992). Thus,
aphids show very complex and rapidly changing within-year dynamics, with each
clone going through several generations during the vegetative season and being
made up of many individuals, which can be widely scattered in space. The survival
of the eggs and/or overwintering aphids determines the numbers of aphids present
the following spring.

The within-year dynamics of aphids are largely determined by seasonal changes
in host quality. Aphids do best when amino acids are actively translocated in the
phloem. In spring, the leaves grow and import amino acids via the phloem; in summer leaves are mature and export mainly sugars. In autumn, the leaves senesce and
export amino acids and other nutrients. Thus on trees the leaves are most suitable
for aphids in spring and autumn. The differences in within-year population dynamics of aphids are due to differences in the effect these seasonal fluctuations in host
plant quality have on the per capita rate of increase and intraspecific competition
in each species. This annual cycle, consisting of two short periods when the host
plant is very favourable and a long intervening period when it is less favourable, is
well documented for tree dwelling aphids. This has greatly facilitated the modelling
of their population dynamics. In general the aphid carrying capacity of annual crop
plants tends to increase with the season until the plants mature after which it tends
to decrease very rapidly. Thus, the aphid carrying capacity of trees tends to be high
in spring and autumn and low in summer, whereas that particularly of short-season
annual crops tends to be low early in a year, peaking mid year and then declining.

Characteristics
Members of the Aphididae are soft-bodied, pear-shaped insects called aphids, as are other members of the superfamily Aphidoidea. Most of them have a pair of little tubes, called cornicles, projecting dorsally from the posterior of their abdomens. The cornicles have been variously interpreted as organs of excretion or for the production of honeydew, but their only confirmed function to date is that they produce fatty alarm pheromones when the insects are attacked by predators.

When wings are present they occur only on particular morphs called "alates", and wingless morphs are said to be "apterous". The forewing (mesothoracic wing) of the alate in the Aphididae has four to six veins attached to a major vein-like structure that has been interpreted as the combined stems of all the other major wing veins. That structure ends in a stigma, a solid spot on the anterior margin of the forewing. The rear (metathoracic) wings have a similar scheme, but simpler in structure, with no stigma The rear wing however, does bear a hamulus, a small hook that, when in flight, engages the claval fold of the forewing, keeping the wing beats in synchrony.

All aphids have very small eyes, sucking mouthparts in the form of a relatively long, segmented rostrum, and fairly long antennae.

These insects are so small (a few millimeters in length), that winds can transport them for fairly long distances. They are often green, but might be red or brown, as well. They move quite slowly and cannot jump or hop. Aphids excrete a sugary liquid called honeydew, because the plant sap from which they feed contains excess carbohydrates relative to its low protein content. To satisfy their protein needs, they absorb large amounts of sap and excrete the excess carbohydrates. Honeydew is used as food by ants, honeybees, and many other insects.

Classification
There is considerable controversy in the classification of aphids, with conservative classifications recognizing as many as 24 subfamilies within a single family Aphididae and others elevating various subfamilies to establish as many as 9 other families within Aphidoidea in addition to Aphididae.

Subfamilies
The Aphid Species File currently (2021) lists:

 Aiceoninae [Eastop & van Emden. 1972?] - monotypic
 Anoeciinae Tullgren, 1909
 Aphidinae Latreille, 1802
 Baltichaitophorinae Heie, 1980
 Calaphidinae Oestlund, 1919
 Chaitophorinae Börner. 1949
 Drepanosiphinae Herrich-Schaeffer, 1857
 Eriosomatinae [Baker, 1920?]
 Greenideinae Baker, 1920
 Hormaphidinae [Baker 1920?]
 Israelaphidinae Ilharco, 1961 - monotypic
 Lachninae Herrich-Schaeffer, 1854
 Lizeriinae Blanchard, 1923
 Macropodaphidinae Zachvatkin & Aizenberg, 1960
 Mindarinae Tullgren, 1909 - monotypic
 Neophyllaphidinae Takahashi, 1921 - monotypic
 Phloeomyzinae Mordvilko, 1934
 Phyllaphidinae Herrich-Schaeffer, 1857
 Pterastheniinae Remaudière & Quednau, 1988
 Saltusaphidinae Baker, 1920
 Spicaphidinae Essig, 1953
 Taiwanaphidinae Quednau & Remaudière, 1994 - monotypic
 Tamaliinae Oestlund, 1923 - monotypic
 Thelaxinae Baker, 1920
 Fossil genera

Selected species

See also
Wooly aphids - Subfamily: Eriosomatinae

References

External links

On the UF / IFAS Featured Creatures Web site:
 Aphis gossypii, melon or cotton aphid
 Aphis nerii, oleander aphid
 Cerataphis brasiliensis, palm aphid
 Hyadaphis coriandri, corianderaphid
  Longistigma caryae, giant bark aphid
 Myzus persicae, green peach aphid''
 Sarucallis kahawaluokalani, crapemyrtle aphid
 Schizaphis graminum, greenbug
 Shivaphis celti, an Asian woolly hackberry aphid
 Sipha flava, yellow sugarcane aphid
 Toxoptera citricida, brown citrus aphid

 
Aphids
Hemiptera families